Portuguese Jesuit priest Melchior Miguel Carniero Leitão was appointed Titular Bishop of Nicaea on January 23, 1555. A year later (on January 26, 1576), Pope Gregory XIII issued an edict for the establishment of the Roman Catholic Diocese of Macau, where Leitão served—he was appointed the first bishop of Macau, a position he occupied till 1581.

No bishop of the diocese had been appointed archbishop or cardinal until Eugénio de Trigueiros and José da Costa Nunes were appointed as archbishops, following a re-designation by the Pope.

Symbol 
All Catholic bishops are appointed by the Pope, and are considered to be messengers (successors of the Apostles) as defined in the catechism of the Catholic Church;.

Responsibilities 
The Bishop of Macau is appointed as the spokesman of the Pope.  He is the leader of the Roman Catholic Church in Macau, which he administers on behalf of the Pope. He is also responsible for the pastoral and charitable work that is carried out within the Diocese.。

Initially, the jurisdiction of the Bishop of Macau included China, Japan, Hong Kong, the Korean Peninsula and neighbouring areas. However, with development and the increasing need for pastoral work, the Vatican has since established more than 600 other Roman Catholic dioceses in the region.  Presently, the Diocese has jurisdiction over six parishes and three quasi-parishes in the Macau Peninsula, Taipa and Coloane.

Bishops

Remarks 

  appointed as auxiliary bishop
  appointed as Assisting Bishop 
  possessed, as taking the responsibility of the position 
  date of assumption of office 
  due to resignation 
  due to his decease 
  date of acting or assuming office 
  resignation accepted by Pope due to retirement 
  transferred to Portugal 
  appointed as Acting Bishop in 1623 
  as Bishop of Japan 
  inaugurated in 1738 
  appointed Archbishop of Diocese of Goa
  transferred to Brasil and left Macau in 1765
  arrived Macau in 1791 
  appointed Assistant Archbishop of Goa 
  transferred to Azores
  appointed Archbishop of the Diocese of Goa and Dammam
  baptized as Auxiliary Bishop of Diocese of Porto
  Acting Bishop in 1963 and 1965, he was elected as Acting Bishop on June 14, 1975 
  Emeritus Bishop of Macau

References 

 
 

 
Macau